The 1928 United States Senate election in Florida was held on November 6, 1928. 

Incumbent Democratic Senator Park Trammell defeated a primary challenge from Governor of Florida John W. Martin and was re-elected to a third term in office over Republican Barclay Warburton.

Democratic primary

Candidates
 John W. Martin, Governor of Florida
 Park Trammell, incumbent Senator since 1917

Results

Republican primary

Candidates
 Barclay Warburton, businessman and Mayor of Palm Beach

Results
Warburton was unopposed for the Republican nomination.

General election

Results

See also 
 1928 United States Senate elections

References 

1928
Florida
United States Senate